Şürük is a village and municipality in the Lankaran Rayon of Azerbaijan.  It has a population of 1,302.

Notable natives 

 Soltanagha Bayramov — National Hero of Azerbaijan.

References 

Populated places in Lankaran District